The Sutton River is a  tributary of the West Branch Passumpsic River, flowing through Burke, Vermont, in Caledonia County, in Vermont.

Course 
The river arises in a Marl Pond, a forested area. It flows southeast through a little forested valley in Vermont, along a railroad and U.S. Route 5(Lynburke Road), up to West Burke.

See also
List of rivers of Vermont

References 

Rivers of Vermont
Tributaries of the Connecticut River
Bodies of water of Caledonia County, Vermont